Ceramus or Keramos is a city on the north coast of the Ceramic Gulf—named after this city—in ancient Caria, in southwest Asia Minor; its ruins can be found outside the modern village of Ören, Muğla Province, Turkey.

History 

Ceramus, initially subjected to Stratonicea, afterwards autonomous, was a member of the Athenian League and was one of the chief cities of the Chrysaorian League (Bulletin de corresp. hellén., IX, 468). It probably had a temple of Zeus Chrysaoreus. In Roman times, it coined its own money. 

Polites of Ceramus was a famous runner who won three different races in the same day at the Olympia.

Ecclesiastical history 

Ceramus is mentioned in the Notitiae Episcopatuum until the 12th or 13th century as a bishopric suffragan to Aphrodisias, or Stauropolis. Three bishops are known: Spudasius (Σπουδάσιος), who attended the First Council of Ephesus in 431; Maurianus (Μαυριανός), who attended the Council of Nicaea in 787; and Symeon (Συμεών), who attended the council in Constantinople that reinstated Photius in 879.

Ceramus is included in the Catholic Church's list of titular sees.

Ancient Coins

Gallery

References

External links
Archaeological Atlas of the Aegean
Catholic Encyclopedia, "Ceramus" at New Advent
Hazlitt, Classical Gazetteer

Archaeological sites in the Aegean Region
Populated places in ancient Caria
Catholic titular sees in Asia
Ancient Greek archaeological sites in Turkey
Former populated places in Turkey
Geography of Muğla Province
History of Muğla Province
Milas District
Members of the Delian League